The 2012–13 Eerste Divisie, known as Jupiler League for sponsorship reasons, was the fifty-seventh season of Eerste Divisie since its establishment in 1955. It began on 10 August 2012 with the first matches of the season and ended on 26 May 2013 with the returns of the finals of the promotion/relegation play-offs, also involving the 16th- and 17th-placed teams from the 2012–13 Eredivisie. On 3 May 2013, during the last round of the regular season, SC Cambuur secured the championship and the only direct promotion berth. Go Ahead Eagles won promotion to the Eredivisie in the play-offs.

Teams
A total of 18 teams took part in the league. PEC Zwolle were promoted from the Eerste Divisie as 2011–12 champions and replaced by bottom-placed Eredivisie SBV Excelsior, whereas Willem II won a top flight place in the nacompetitie, replacing De Graafschap, who were eliminated from the post-season playoff and therefore relegated to Eerste Divisie for this season. No team was promoted from the Topklasse, thus allowing last-placed FC Emmen to keep their place in the second tier.

Managerial changes

League table

Playoffs
Roda JC and VVV-Venlo joined the Eerste Divisie-teams for the playoffs, after finishing 16th and 17th in the Eredivisie.

Round 1

Round 2

Round 3

Both winners qualify for 2013–14 Eredivisie.

References

External links
 

Eerste Divisie seasons
2012–13 in Dutch football
Neth